The Halliste is an -long river in Viljandi County, Estonia, and is a left tributary of the river Navesti. Its source is on the Sakala Uplands. The basin area of Halliste is 1,900 km2 and it has an average discharge 17.3 m³/s.

References 

Rivers of Estonia
Landforms of Viljandi County